André Maranne (14 May 1926 – 12 April 2021) was a French-born British actor best known for playing roles in English-language films beginning in the mid-1950s.

Life and career
Born André Gaston Maillol in Toulouse, France, Maranne's best known role was probably Sergeant François Chevalier in six Pink Panther films alongside Peter Sellers and Herbert Lom. Before the Pink Panther, he appeared as a French officer in The War Lover (1962) and had a cameo role in the James Bond movie Thunderball (1965).

He appeared in such diverse television programmes as Merton Park Studios' Scotland Yard (as a gendarme in 1956 episode "Wall of Death" and credited as André Maillol & the 1957 episode "Night Crossing" as Detective Nouvel credited as Andre Maranne), Jason King ("Wanna buy a television series?", 1971), Fawlty Towers (as André in the 1975 "Gourmet Night" episode), Lord Peter Wimsey ("Clouds of Witness", 1972), Yes Minister (as European Agricultural Commissioner Maurice, proponent of the "euro-sausage", in "Party Games", 1984, the episode in which Jim Hacker becomes UK Prime Minister), All Creatures Great and Small and Doctor Who (The Moonbase, 1967).

Maranne was also a co-presenter of four in the French teaching programme, Bonjour Françoise on the BBC in the 1960s and acted in all eight episodes of La Chasse au Trésor (1967) as well as all 24 episodes of Ensemble-French for Beginners in the 1970s, also for the BBC. Maranne provided English audio translation of French-speaking interviewees in the 1988 ITV documentary The Men Who Killed Kennedy.

Maranne died 12 April 2021 in Brighton, England at the age of 94. He was survived by his wife, Moira.

Selected filmography

Wicked as They Come (1956) as Paris Barman (uncredited)
Port Afrique (1956) as Police Officer
Loser Takes All (1956) as Bar Waiter (uncredited)
Rogue's Yarn (1957) as French Fisherman (uncredited)
The Birthday Present (1957) as French Customs Officer (uncredited)
Carve Her Name with Pride (1958) as Garage Man
Law and Disorder (1958) as Fisherman (uncredited)
Harry Black (1958) as Frenchman
The Whole Truth (1958) as Car owner
The Square Peg (1958) as Jean-Claude
The Giant Behemoth (1959) as French Radio Officer (uncredited)
A French Mistress (1960) as Dubbing (voice)
The Greengage Summer (1961) as Mounsieur Dufour
Two Wives at One Wedding (1961) as Paul
Middle Course (1961) as Franz
The Silent Invasion (1962) as Argen
H.M.S. Defiant (1962) as Colonel Giraud
The War Lover (1962) as French Officer (uncredited)
Come Fly with Me (1963) as French Hotel Clerk (uncredited)
Maniac (1963) as Salon (voice, uncredited)
A Shot in the Dark (1964) as Sgt. François Chevalier 
The Beauty Jungle (1964) as Lift Man (uncredited)
Night Train to Paris (1964) as Louis Vernay
Return from the Ashes (1965) as 2nd Detective (voice, uncredited)
Thunderball (1965) as SPECTRE No. 10 (uncredited)
Doctor in Clover (1966) as Pierre in French film
The Terrornauts (1967) as Gendarme
The Girl on a Motorcycle (1968) as French Superintendent
Duffy (1968) as Garain
Battle of Britain (1969) as French Army Signals NCO
Darling Lili (1970) as Lt. Liggett
And Soon the Darkness (1970) as Radio DJ (voice, uncredited)
The Guardians (1971) as Felicien de Bastion
Our Miss Fred (1972) as French Resistance Fighter
Bequest to the Nation (1973) as Adm. Villenueuve
Paul and Michelle (1974) as Bellancourt
Percy's Progress (1974) as French Newsreader (uncredited)
Gold (1974) as Syndicate Member
The Return of the Pink Panther (1975) as Sgt. François Chevalier
The Pink Panther Strikes Again (1976) as Sgt François Chevalier
Revenge of the Pink Panther (1978) as Sgt. François Chevalier 
The London Connection (1979) as Duvalier
S.O.S. Titanic (1979) as Michel Navratil
Rise and Fall of Idi Amin (1981) as French Ambassador
Trail of the Pink Panther (1982) as Sgt. François Chevalier
Curse of the Pink Panther (1983) as Sgt. François Chevalier
The Razor's Edge (1984) as Joseph, the butler
Morons from Outer Space (1985) as Prof. Trousseau
Plenty (1985) as Villon

References

External links

Broadcasting for Schools UK – La Chasse au Trésor

1926 births
2021 deaths
20th-century French male actors
French emigrants to England
French male film actors
French male television actors
Male actors from Toulouse